The Harbin Z-9 (NATO reporting name "Haitun",  for Dolphin) is a Chinese military utility helicopter with civilian variants. It is a licensed variant of the French Eurocopter AS365 Dauphin, and is manufactured by Harbin Aircraft Manufacturing Corporation.

Design and development
The first Z-9 flew in 1981, and was built in China from components supplied by Aérospatiale as part of a production patent bought on 15 October 1980. On 16 January 1992, the indigenous variant Z-9B, constructed with 70% Chinese-made parts, flew successfully. The flight test was completed in November 1992 and the design was finalized a month later. Z-9B production began in 1993 and entered PLA service in 1994.

The Z-9B features an 11-blade Fenestron faired-in tail rotor with wider-chord, all-composite blades replacing the 13-blade used in the original AS365N. As a light tactical troop transport, the Z-9 has the capacity to transport 10 fully armed soldiers. Generally the Z-9 is identical to the AS365N Dauphin, though later variants of the Z-9 incorporate more composite materials to increase structural strength and lower radar signature. 

The helicopter has a four-blade main rotor, with two turboshaft engines mounted side by side on top of the cabin with engine layout identical to the AS365N. The Z-9 teardrop-shaped body features a tapered boom to the tail fin, with rounded nose and stepped-up cockpit, retractable gear, and all flat bottom.

In 2002, Harbin obtained Chinese certification for the new H410A variant of the Z-9, which features more powerful Turbomeca Arriel 2C turboshaft engines; Eurocopter issued official objections to Harbin's decision to continue production in spite of the license-production agreement having expired, leading to a period of highly sensitive international negotiations to resolve the dispute.

Variants
An armed variant has been fielded by the PLA since the early 1990s as the Z-9W, with pylons fitted for anti-tank missiles. These helicopters lack the maneuverability and survivability of a proper attack helicopter, and merely provide a stopgap during the development of the Z-10. The latest armed version, the Z-9W, was introduced in 2005 and has night attack capabilities, with an under-nose low-light TV and infra-red observing and tracking unit.

The naval version introduced in the 1990s is known as the Z-9C. As well as SAR and ASW duties, the Z-9C can be fitted with an X-band KLC-1 surface search radar to detect surface targets beyond the range of shipborne radar systems.

Z-9 License-produced variant of the French AS.365N1.

Z-9A Kit-built variant of the AS.365N2.

Z-9A-100 Prototypes for domestic market versions with WZ8A engines. First flight 16 January 1992, approved 30 December 1992.

Z-9B Initial version based on Z-9A-100. Multi-role.

Z-9C License-produced variant of the Eurocopter AS.565 Panther for the PLA Naval Air Force.

Z-9EC ASW variant produced for the Pakistan Naval Air Arm. Configured with pulse-compression radar, low frequency dipping sonar, radar warning receiver and doppler navigation system, it is also armed with torpedoes for use aboard Pakistan Navy's Zulfiquar-class frigates.

Z-9EH Transport, emergency and/or passenger variant.

Z-9W Armed version with optional pylon-mounted armament, gyro stabilization and roof-mounted optical sight. Export designation Z-9G, roof-mounted sight optional. First flown in 1987, with the first weapons tests in 1989.

Z-9WA A newer night-capable version has been built with nose-mounted FLIR. July 2011, Xinhua News Agency released a photo of Z-9WA firing AKD10 air-to-ground missile. Incorporates a domestic Chinese helmet mounted sight that is compatible with anti-tank missiles such as HJ-8/9/10, as well as light anti-ship missiles such as C-701/703 and TL-1/10 when they are used as air-to-surface missiles, air-to-air missiles such as TY-90 and other MANPAD missiles for self-defense.

H410A Version with 635 kW WZ8C turbo-shaft engines. First flight September 2001, CAAC certification 10 July 2002. One is currently being fitted with a new Mast-Mounted Sighting (MMS) system.

H425 Newest VIP version of the H410A.

H450 Projected development.

Z-19 Attack helicopter development with tandem seats. The Z-19 shares the same powerplant as the Z-9WA.

Operators

Bangladesh Navy (on order)

Bolivian Army 

Cambodian Air Force
Cambodian Gendarmerie

Cameroon Air Force

People's Liberation Army Air Force
People's Liberation Army Ground Air Force
People's Liberation Army Naval Air Force 
 Type 052D destroyer
 Type 053 frigate, Type 053H3 frigate, Type 054 frigate, Type 054A frigate (Z-9C)
 Type 056 corvette (Z-9C)

Djiboutian Air Force

Ghana Air Force

Kenya Defence Forces

Laotian Air Force

Mali Air Force

Mauritanian Air Force

Namibian Air Force
 
Pakistan Naval Air Arm
 
Zambian Air Force

Specifications (Z-9B)

See also

References

External links

 AirForceWorld.com Z-9 Helicopter Family
 www.sinodefence.com

1990s Chinese attack aircraft
Military helicopters
Harbin aircraft
1990s Chinese helicopters
1990s Chinese military utility aircraft
China–France relations
Twin-turbine helicopters
Aircraft first flown in 1981